James Thackeray (23 November 1881–1968) was an English footballer who played in the Football League for Bradford (Park Avenue) and Middlesbrough.

References

1881 births
1968 deaths
English footballers
Association football forwards
English Football League players
Hebburn Argyle F.C. players
Middlesbrough F.C. players
Bradford (Park Avenue) A.F.C. players
West Stanley F.C. players